Brumstead (or Brunstead) is a village and a civil parish in the English county of Norfolk.

History
Brumstead's name is of Anglo-Saxon origin and derives from the Old English for a settlement or estate near thorny bushes or shrubs.

In the Domesday Book, Brumstead is recorded as a settlement of 21 households belonging to Roger Bigod. The survey mentions the village also held 30 goats, a church and a mill alongside pannage or woodland for 16 pigs.

The village has also been known for hundreds of years as Brunstead as old maps demonstrate. The village is known locally as Brunstead, as demonstrated by the village sign.

Geography
The parish had in 2001 census, a population of 84. At the 2011 census the population remained less than 100 and was included in the civil parish of East Ruston.

St. Peter's Church
Brumstead's Parish Church is dedicated to Saint Peter and is of Norman origin.

Transport
The nearest railway station is at North Walsham for the Bittern Line which runs between Cromer and Norwich. The nearest airport is Norwich. 

For the purposes of local government, the parish falls within the district of North Norfolk. The village is situated on the route of the B1159 that runs between the town of Cromer and the town of Stalham.

War Memorial
Brumstead's War Memorial is located inside St. Peter's Church and is a white marble plaque. It lists the following names for the First World War:
 Second-Lieutenant Percy C. H. Bird (d.1916), 10th Battalion, Royal Norfolk Regiment
 Leading-Seaman Stanley Ellis (1892-1918), S.S. Tyrhang
 Lance-Corporal George R. Parnacott (d.1914), 1st Battalion, Hampshire Regiment
 Private J. C. Lacey (1891-1919), 58th Battalion, Canadian Army
 Private Ernest B. Bullock (d.1916), 2nd Battalion, Royal Norfolk Regiment
 Private Jesse Sutton (d.1918), 9th Battalion, Royal Norfolk Regiment
 Private B. H. Ellis DCM (1888-1918), 2nd Battalion, Northamptonshire Regiment
 Private J. R. Plummer (1887-1918), 7th Battalion, Royal Sussex Regiment

References

External links

Villages in Norfolk
Civil parishes in Norfolk
North Norfolk